Alastair Watson is the name of:

 Alastair Watson (soldier) (born 1953), Private Secretary to Prince Andrew, Duke of York
 Alastair MacDonald Watson (1909–1987), English cricketer